Robin Chesnut-Tangerman is a Vermont politician who served as the Progressive Caucus Leader of the Vermont House of Representatives, representing the Rutland-Bennington district. He is the owner-operator of Talisman Woodwork. He is also an environmental columnist for the Rutland Herald, writing a column called Weekly Planet and participates in community theater.

References

External links
 Election website

21st-century American politicians
Living people
Members of the Vermont House of Representatives
People from Middletown Springs, Vermont
Vermont Progressive Party politicians
Year of birth missing (living people)